The Dharma of Star Wars is a book by Matthew Bortolin. The book is a primer for basic Buddhist philosophy using the fictional characters and events of the Star Wars saga to explicate the Buddha's teachings.

Bortolin, an ordained Zen Buddhist and Star Wars fan, explains the principles and practices of Buddhism through the words and actions of Darth Vader, Luke Skywalker, Yoda and other Star Wars characters. The book also examines the underlying philosophical ideas of Star Wars from a Buddhist perspective.

External links
 http://www.filmthreat.com/index.php?section=interviews&Id=948

2005 non-fiction books
American non-fiction books
Buddhism studies books
Books about Star Wars